Gaoshengqiao is a transfer station on Line 3 and Line 5 of the Chengdu Metro in China.

Gallery

References

Railway stations in Sichuan
Railway stations in China opened in 2016
Chengdu Metro stations